Tveide is a village in Birkenes municipality in Agder county, Norway. Historically, there was a railway station here along the now-closed Lillesand-Flaksvand Line.

References

Villages in Agder
Birkenes